The 1904 All England Championships was a badminton tournament held at the London Rifle Brigade Drill Hall in Islington, London, England from 16 to 19 March 1904.

Henry Norman Marrett made a clean sweep of victories by winning the men's singles, men's doubles and mixed doubles. Ethel Thomson retained her women's singles title and teamed up again with Meriel Lucas to win the women's doubles. Lucas had missed the 1903 competition.

The venue made six courts available and the event was extended to four days in order to include an England v Ireland international match.

Final results

Men's singles

Women's singles

Men's doubles

Women's doubles

Mixed doubles

References

All England Open Badminton Championships
All England Badminton Championships
All England Open Badminton Championships in London
All England Championships
All England Badminton Championships